Brett Bellemore (born June 25, 1988) is a Canadian former professional ice hockey defenceman who most recently played with Esbjerg Energy in the Metal Ligaen (DEN). He previously played in the National Hockey League (NHL) for the Carolina Hurricanes. Bellemore was selected in the 6th round, 162nd overall, by the Hurricanes in the 2007 NHL Entry Draft.

Playing career
Bellemore played major junior with the Plymouth Whalers in the Ontario Hockey League before he was signed to a three-year entry level contract with the Hurricanes on May 15, 2008.

On July 8, 2011, Bellemore signed a two-year, two-way contract with the Carolina Hurricanes. The contract was worth $525,000 per year at the NHL level and $70,000 per year at the AHL level.

On June 28, 2013, Bellemore signed a one-year, two-way contract to remain with the Hurricanes.

After 6 seasons within the Hurricanes organization, Bellemore became a free agent. Unable to secure a contract, Bellemore began training with the New York Rangers after receiving a try-out to training camp on September 9, 2015. After his release from the Rangers pre-season roster, Bellemore agreed to a one-year AHL contract with the Providence Bruins, affiliate to the Boston Bruins on October 9, 2015.

For a second consecutive season, Bellemore faced free agency in the off-season. On July 24, 2016, Bellemore opted to continue his career in the Kontinental Hockey League, signing a one-year deal with Chinese entrant, HC Kunlun Red Star.

Career statistics

References

External links
 

1988 births
Living people
Albany River Rats players
Canadian ice hockey defencemen
Carolina Hurricanes draft picks
Carolina Hurricanes players
Charlotte Checkers (2010–) players
Esbjerg Energy players
Ice hockey people from Ontario
HC Kunlun Red Star players
Plymouth Whalers players
Providence Bruins players
Sportspeople from Windsor, Ontario
Canadian expatriate ice hockey players in China